Kenworth is an American-based truck manufacturer.

Kenworth may also refer to:

 Kenworth T600, a model line of trucks produced 1984–2007
 Kenworth W900, a model line of trucks whose production began in 1961
 Kenworth Historic District, in Hickory, Catawba County, North Carolina
 Jim Kenworth, British playwright
 Kenworth Moffett (1934–2016), American art curator

See also
 Kenworthy (disambiguation)